The Rhône–Rhine Canal is one of the important watershed canals of the French waterways, connecting the Rhine to the Saône and the Rhône and thereby the North Sea and the Mediterranean. As built, the canal was made up of four distinct sections:
Developments for high-capacity navigation in the second half of the 20th century thoroughly transformed this Y-shaped system. When the first lock was built on the Grand Canal d'Alsace at Kembs, a new cut was also excavated from Kembs to Niffer, and the rest of the Canal de Huningue was upgraded from here to the docks at Mulhouse. A 3-km-long section of the former Canal de Huningue, from Niffer to Kembs, is maintained and gives access to a boat harbour, while the remainder of that canal to Basel has been closed, and the terminal basin transformed into a whitewater canoeing course.

Most of the northern branch was abandoned, and in the early 1980s the A36 motorway sliced through the canal embankment east of Mulhouse. Two sections were maintained and new cuts built from the Rhine to make them accessible:
 and a  lateral canal starting from a new entrance lock at Rhinau and finishing in the basins of the port of Strasbourg. 
A further major upheaval, planned from the 1960s, was construction of a high-capacity waterway to connect the Rhône-Saône corridor with the main European waterway network. This project was abandoned by Environment Minister Dominique Voynet in 1997.

The section from Mulhouse to Neuf-Brisach is abandoned, while the 29 km section between Artzenheim and Friesenheim has been partially restored by Alsace Region, but works were stopped in 2009 for financial reasons. A cycle path was built along this section in 2011, extending the popular cycle path south from Strasbourg.

History 
The first section of the Canal de Franche-Comté was authorised by Burgundy Council in 1783 and completed in 1802 from the Saône to Dôle. Napoleon was seeking to develop inland waterway connections throughout the country, and the Rhône-Rhine link was of such strategic importance that he gave his name to the project. The Emperor’s administration conceived the predecessor of today’s public-private partnership model, selling existing canals to private companies, to provide funds for new links. The proceeds were diverted for the war effort, and it was not until 1821 that this project, now renamed ‘Canal Monsieur’, was reactivated by the canal company set up for this purpose. Works were completed in 1833. Upgrading to Freycinet standards started in 1882, and the summit level was lowered, reducing the number of locks. The new high-capacity Rhine-Rhône waterway would have made the canal obsolete, but the environment minister Dominique Voynet cancelled that project in 1997. The Government then funded – as compensation – the backlog of maintenance works and other improvements, but with little impact on commercial traffic in 250-tonne péniches, which has all but disappeared.

See also
List of canals in France
Hutchinson Encyclopedia
Waterways in France on Discover France!
Canal du Rhône au Rhin, waterways guide No. 9, Editions du Breil, France, texts in French, English and German

References

External sources 

 Canal du Rhône au Rhin with information on places, ports and moorings on the canal, by the author of Inland Waterways of France, Imray
 River Ill and Canal du Rhône au Rhin (North) with information on places, ports and moorings on the canal, by the author of Inland Waterways of France, Imray
 Navigation details for 80 French rivers and canals (French waterways website section)

Canals in France
Rhine
Rhône
Canals opened in 1834